Chinmayanand (born Krishna Pal Singh) is a former union minister from the Indian state of Uttar Pradesh. He was minister of state for internal affairs in third Vajpayee ministry. He was elected to 13th Lok Sabha from Jaunpur in Uttar Pradesh as a Bharatiya Janata Party candidate in 1999. He was member of 10th Lok Sabha from Badaun in 1991 and from Machhlishahr in 1998.

In August 2019, a female student at a college run by him posted a video alleging sexual exploitation by Swami Chinmayanand. He was arrested after the girl allegedly went missing. He was charged for misusing authority for sex, stalking, wrongful confinement and criminal intimidation. In response to the allegations, Chinmayanand alleged that the woman had attempted to extort money from him. She was arrested in connection with his complaint and is currently in custody. The case against Chinmayanand and the woman are pending.

In February 2020, Chinmayanand was granted bail, but was re-arrested in July 2020. The head of the Special Investigative Tribunal stated to press that Chinmayanand had admitted to asking the student to massage him. He has been charged with offences including sexual exploitation and criminal intimidation.

References

1947 births
Living people
India MPs 1991–1996
India MPs 1998–1999
India MPs 1999–2004
University of Lucknow alumni
People from Gonda district
Lok Sabha members from Uttar Pradesh
Bharatiya Janata Party politicians from Uttar Pradesh
People from Budaun district
People from Jaunpur district